The 56th government of Turkey (11 January 1999 – 28 May 1999) was a minority government led by Bülent Ecevit of Democratic Left Party (DSP).

Background 
The election results of 1995 necessitated a series of coalition governments, all of which were unstable. Finally, Bülent Ecevit, the leader of DSP, was asked to form a minority government to serve as a caretaker government until new elections. Although DSP was the fourth party measured by seats, the others promised to support his government without formally participating in it.

The government

Aftermath
The government ended because of the elections held on 18 April 1999.

References

Cabinets established in 1999
Cabinets of Turkey
Cabinets disestablished in 1999
Democratic Left Party (Turkey)
Members of the 56th government of Turkey
Minority governments
1999 establishments in Turkey
1999 disestablishments in Turkey